Iceliini is a tribe of bristle flies in the family Tachinidae. There is at least one genus. There is at least one described species in Iceliini, I. triquetra.

A genus of Iceliini is Icelia Robineau-Desvoidy, 1830.

References

Further reading

External links

 

Tachininae